Han Xinyun and Ye Qiuyu successfully defended their title, defeating Guo Hanyu and Wang Xinyu in the final, 7–6(7–3), 7–6(8–6).

Seeds

Draw

Draw

References
Main Draw

Industrial Bank Cup - Doubles
Industrial Bank Cup